The Co-cathedral of Saint Nicholas of Bari is a Roman Catholic co-cathedral located in Alacant, in the Valencian Community of Spain. The church, part of the Diocese of Orihuela-Alicante is dedicated to Saint Nicholas and was elevated to the title of cathedral on 9 March 1959 by Pope John XXIII.

Design

This church was built between 1613 and 1662. It was designed between 1610 and 1615 by Agustín Bernardino, a student of Juan de Herrera, and was constructed over an ancient mosque. The older cloister was built originally in the 15th century in Valencian Gothic style.

The cathedral has a Latin cross plan, though the transepts are quite short. Flanking the nave are six interconnecting side chapels and an ambulatory around the apse. A blue dome rises 45 meters above the crossing. The chapel of Holy Communion, configured as a small Greek cross-planned temple, is considered to be one of the most beautiful examples of the Spanish Baroque.

The external appearance of the cathedral is quite sober. The main facade located on the east side is of the Doric order, and the one built on the south side is of Ionic order.

References

External links

 Official website of the San Nicolas Cathedral 

Buildings and structures in Alicante
Roman Catholic cathedrals in the Valencian Community
17th-century Roman Catholic church buildings in Spain
Roman Catholic churches completed in 1662
Baroque architecture in the Valencian Community
Herrerian architecture
1662 establishments in Spain
Bien de Interés Cultural landmarks in the Province of Alicante